Keni is a 1982 Indian Malayalam-language film, directed by J. Sasikumar and produced by Prem Navas. The film stars K. R. Vijaya, Prem Nazir, Bahadoor and K. P. A. C. Azeez . The film has musical score by G. Devarajan.

Cast

K. R. Vijaya as Nirmala Rajendran
Prem Nazir as Rajendran
Bahadoor as Pravachambalam Prabhakaran Nair
KPAC Azeez as Jaffar
Sathaar as Chandran
Shubha as Rajani
Adoor Bhasi as Girija Vallabha Menon
Mammootty as Babu
Renuchandra as Beena
Janardanan as Madhusoodanan
KPAC Sunny as Thamburaan
Ramu as Ravi

Soundtrack
The music was composed by G. Devarajan and the lyrics were written by Perumpuzha Gopalakrishnan.

References

External links
 

1982 films
1980s Malayalam-language films
Films directed by J. Sasikumar